Leucopogon pulchellus, commonly known as coast beard-heath,  is a shrub in the family Ericaceae, native to the south west of Western Australia. It grows to heights between 15 cm and 1.5 m, generally on lateritic or granitic soils, and its white flowers may be seen from  June or November or from January to February.

It was first described in 1845 by Otto Wilhelm Sonder, with its specific epithet, pulchellus, being derived from the Latin adjective meaning "beautiful and little".

Its conservation status is "not threatened".

References

External links

Leucopogon pulchellus occurrence data from Australasian Virtual Herbarium

pulchellus
Ericales of Australia
Eudicots of Western Australia
Plants described in 1845
Taxa named by Otto Wilhelm Sonder